The 2021 Drydene 200 was a NASCAR Xfinity Series race held on May 15, 2021. It was contested over 200 on the  concrete oval. It was the tenth race of the 2021 NASCAR Xfinity Series season. Team Penske driver Austin Cindric, collected his third win of the season.

Report

Background
Dover International Speedway is an oval race track in Dover, Delaware, United States that has held at least two NASCAR races since it opened in 1969. In addition to NASCAR, the track also hosted USAC and the NTT IndyCar Series. The track features one layout, a  concrete oval, with 24° banking in the turns and 9° banking on the straights. The speedway is owned and operated by Dover Motorsports.

The track, nicknamed "The Monster Mile", was built in 1969 by Melvin Joseph of Melvin L. Joseph Construction Company, Inc., with an asphalt surface, but was replaced with concrete in 1995. Six years later in 2001, the track's capacity moved to 135,000 seats, making the track have the largest capacity of sports venue in the mid-Atlantic. In 2002, the name changed to Dover International Speedway from Dover Downs International Speedway after Dover Downs Gaming and Entertainment split, making Dover Motorsports. From 2007 to 2009, the speedway worked on an improvement project called "The Monster Makeover", which expanded facilities at the track and beautified the track. After the 2014 season, the track's capacity was reduced to 95,500 seats.

Entry list 

 (R) denotes rookie driver.
 (i) denotes driver who is ineligible for series driver points.

Qualifying
Daniel Hemric was awarded the pole for the race as determined by competition-based formula. Jordan Anderson, Ronnie Bassett Jr., and Andy Lally did not have enough points to qualify for the race.

Starting Lineups

Race

Race results

Stage Results 
Stage One
Laps: 45

Stage Two
Laps: 45

Final Stage Results 

Laps: 110

Race statistics 

 Lead changes: 9 among 6 different drivers
 Cautions/Laps: 7 for 45
 Time of race: 2 hours, 6 minutes, and 20 seconds
 Average speed:

References 

NASCAR races at Dover Motor Speedway
2021 in sports in Delaware
Drydene 200
2021 NASCAR Xfinity Series